Angelia is a daughter of Hermes in Greek mythology.

Angelia may also refer to:

People
 Sandra Angelia (born 1986), Miss Indonesia 2008
 Angelia Thurston Newman (1837–1910), American writer, editor, and lecturer
 Angelia Ong (born 1990), Miss Earth 2015

Other uses
 "Angelia" (song), 1989 song by Richard Marx
 Angelos (mythology) or Angelia, a daughter of Zeus and Hera in Greek mythology